Highland County is a county located in the U.S. state of Ohio. As of the 2020 census, the population was 43,317. Its county seat is Hillsboro. The county is named for the topography which is hilly and divides the watersheds of the Little Miami and Scioto Rivers.

Geography

Adjacent counties
 Fayette County (north)
 Ross County (northeast)
 Pike County (east)
 Adams County (southeast)
 Brown County (southwest)
 Clinton County (northwest)

Major highways

Demographics

2000 census
As of the census of 2010, there were 43,589 people living in Highland County. The population density is 78.8 people per square mile. The county is made up of 96.4% White, 1.5% Black or African American, 0.3% Native American, 0.3% Asian, 1.5% from two or more races, and 0.8% Hispanic or Latino.

This county is also made up of 6.2% of people under the age of 5, 24.7% of people under the age of 18, and 16.5% of people over the age of 65. The median age is 39.2. The county is also 51% female.

There are 16,963 households in Highland County as of the 2010 census. The average household size is 2.58 persons, while the average family size is 3.04 persons.  According to the 2010 census, 41.9% of the houses in Highland County had children under the age of 18 living with them, 53.07% of the houses were married couples living together, 11.09% of the houses had a female householder with no husband present, and 29.91% of the houses were non-families. Individuals made up 24.33% of all households, and 11.02% had someone living alone who was 65 years of age or older.

According to the census, 81.5% of people over the age of 25 is at least a high school graduate and 11.1% of people over the age of 25 have earned at least a bachelor's degree. The median household income is $39,641 and 17.6% of people live below the poverty line. The per capita income of Highland County is $19,557.

2010 census
As of the 2010 United States Census, there were 43,589 people, 16,693 households, and 11,819 families residing in the county. The racial makeup of the county was 96.5% white, 1.4% black or African American, 0.3% American Indian, 0.2% Asian, 0.1% from other races, and 1.5% from two or more races. Those of Hispanic or Latino origin made up 0.7% of the population. In terms of ancestry, 23.8% were German, 14.9% were Irish, 14.3% were American, and 10.7% were English.

Of the 16,693 households, 34.0% had children under the age of 18 living with them, 53.1% were married couples living together, 11.9% had a female householder with no husband present, 29.2% were non-families, and 24.3% of all households were made up of individuals. The average household size was 2.58 and the average family size was 3.04. The median age was 39.2 years.

The median income for a household in the county was $39,844 and the median income for a family was $48,604. Males had a median income of $38,892 versus $29,167 for females. The per capita income for the county was $18,966. About 12.4% of families and 16.2% of the population were below the poverty line, including 22.2% of those under age 18 and 12.7% of those age 65 or over.

Politics
Highland County is a Republican stronghold county in presidential elections. The last time it voted for the Democratic Presidential candidate was for Lyndon B. Johnson in 1964.

|}

Education

School districts
Highland County is home to five school districts: Greenfield Exempted Village Schools in Greenfield, Hillsboro City Schools in Hillsboro, Fairfield Local School District in Leesburg, Bright Local School District in Mowrystown, and Lynchburg-Clay Local School District in Lynchburg.

Libraries
The Highland County District Library  is the public library system serving Highland County, Ohio.  The main library is in Hillsboro, with four branches located in Greenfield, Leesburg, Lynchburg, and Rocky Fork.  The library is a member of the SEO Consortium which allows patrons access to over 6.9 million items owned by member libraries.

Recreation 
There are currently several recreational areas in Highland County.  There is Rocky Fork State Park which is located 5 miles east of Hillsboro.  It provides opportunities to go camping, fishing, boating, swimming, hunting, putt-putt, and disc golf amongst other activities.

There is also Paint Creek State Park located 13 miles east of Hillsboro. Paint Creek offers many of the same activities as Rocky Fork but also offers horse riding, mountain biking, and winter recreational activities.

Fort Hill State Memorial is a memorial built by the Hopewell people that is located 10 miles southeast of Hillsboro and is believed to be around 2000 years old.

Fallsville Wildlife Area is located 4 miles north of Hillsboro. It offers fishing, hunting, hiking, and wildlife watching.

Non-profits
Habitat for Humanity of Highland County  was established in 2000, and has since built three homes: one on Johnson St. in Hillsboro and two on 2nd St. in Greenfield. Highland County Habitat is a locally run affiliate of Habitat for Humanity International, a nonprofit, ecumenical Christian housing organization. Habitat for Humanity works in partnership with people in need to build and renovate decent, affordable housing. The houses then are sold to those in need at no profit and with no interest charged.

Highlands Sanctuary is a chain of nature preserves centered in Highland County and owned by an organization of the same name.

Communities

City
 Hillsboro (county seat)

Villages
 Greenfield
 Highland
 Leesburg
 Lynchburg
 Mowrystown
 Sardinia
 Sinking Spring

Townships

 Brushcreek
 Clay
 Concord
 Dodson
 Fairfield
 Hamer
 Jackson
 Liberty
 Madison
 Marshall
 New Market
 Paint
 Penn
 Salem
 Union
 Washington
 Whiteoak

Census-designated places
 Buford
 Highland Holiday
 Rocky Fork Point

Unincorporated communities

 Allensburg
 Belfast
 Berrysville
 Boston
 Bridges
 Carmel
 Dodsonville
 East Danville
 Elmville
 Fairfax
 Folsom
 Hoagland
 Hollowtown
 Marshall
 New Market
 New Petersburg
 Pricetown
 Rainsboro
 Samantha
 Sugar Tree Ridge
 Taylorsville

See also
 Fort Hill State Memorial
 National Register of Historic Places listings in Highland County, Ohio
 Highland County Airport
 Highland County Courthouse
 Rocky Fork State Park
 Paint Creek State Park

References

External links
 

 
Appalachian Ohio
Counties of Appalachia
1805 establishments in Ohio
Populated places established in 1805